Patrick Joseph Broderick (1 September 1939 – 8 February 2020) was an Irish National Hunt jockey. Known as Paddy Broderick, he was the jockey on board Night Nurse who won two Champion Hurdle races in 1976 and 1977.

After Broderick moved from Ireland to Britain, he began riding for northern trainer Arthur Stephenson and it was he who advised Broderick to adopt the long-reined policeman-style of riding. The trainer and jockey had a fruitful partnership yielding many winners including the Welsh Grand National on Rainbow Battle in 1964 and the Mackeson Gold Cup on Pawnbroker in 1964.

Broderick rode 459 winners in 17 seasons in Britain but in an interview in 2001, he said that by far the best horse he ever sat on was Night Nurse.

Ironically, it was Night Nurse who brought an end to Broderick's riding career when at the Boxing Day meeting at Kempton Park in 1977, the horse parted company with Broderick who sustained an injury which resulted in his retirement from the sport.

References

British jockeys
Irish jockeys
1939 births
2020 deaths